Ibrāhīm ibn al-Walīd ibn ʿAbd al-Malik (died 25 January 750) was an Umayyad caliph, and a son of Caliph al-Walid I (r. 705–715). He ruled from 4 October 744 to 4 December 744. He was the penultimate Caliph of the Umayyad Caliphate.

Background  
Ibrahim was a son of the Umayyad caliph al-Walid I. His mother was a slave concubine named Su'ar or Budayra.

Reign 
Yazid III named his brother Ibrahim as his successor. Yazid fell ill of a brain tumour and died on October 3 or 4, 744. Ibrahim duly succeeded him.
Ibrahim ruled for two months in 744 before he abdicated, and went into hiding out of fear of his political opponents. The shortness of this time and his incomplete acceptance led Muhammad ibn Jarir al-Tabari to state that he did not succeed in becoming caliph (v. 26, p. 247). However, al-Tabari (p. 13) does record that Ibrahim as caliph did confirm the appointment of Abdallah ibn Umar as governor of Iraq (v. 27, p. 13).

Abdication 
Ibrahim was named heir apparent by his brother Yazid III. Marwan II decided to oppose Yazid III, and even though he later gave allegiance to Yazid, on the early death of that caliph, Marwan continued his own ambitions. Ibrahim requested and was granted Marwan's assurance of personal safety. He travelled with Marwan to former Caliph Hisham's residence at Rusafah in Syria. Like most members of the Umayyad family, Ibrahim was executed by the Abbasids in 750.

See also 
 Umar ibn al-Walid
 Abd al-Aziz ibn al-Walid
 Al-Abbas ibn al-Walid
 Bishr ibn al-Walid

References

Bibliography 
 
 
 
 
 

710s births
750 deaths
Year of birth uncertain
8th-century Umayyad caliphs
8th-century rulers in Asia
8th-century rulers in Africa
8th-century rulers in Europe
8th-century Arabs
8th-century executions by the Abbasid Caliphate
Year of birth unknown
People of the Third Fitna
Umayyad governors of Jordan